Belantis is an amusement park next to Leipzig, Germany. Covering 27 hectares, the park offers over 60 attractions, including four roller coasters.

History 
The park was bought by Parques Reunidos in 2018.

List of roller coasters 

Huracan has a steeper-than-vertical first hill and five inversions.

List of water rides 
The water ride Fluch des Pharao starts from a pyramid with a height of 38 m.

Further attractions 

This list in incomplete.

Gallery

References

External links 

 Official website
 List of attractions at freizeitpark-welt.de

Amusement parks in Germany
Amusement parks opened in 2003
Tourist attractions in Saxony